Adam David Murray (born 30 September 1981) is an English football manager and former professional footballer who is now manager of  club AFC Fylde. A creative midfielder, he made over 500 appearances in a 17-year playing career in the Premier League, Football League and Football Conference.

An England under-20 international, he turned professional at Derby County, making his Premier League debut in April 1999. He played 62 games in six seasons at Derby, including 32 Premier League matches, but struggled with alcoholism and spent four weeks in recovery at the Priory Hospital. He spent time on loan at Mansfield Town (winning promotion out of the Third Division in 2001–02) and Kidderminster Harriers, before leaving Derby in November 2003. He had brief non-contract spells at Notts County and Burton Albion, before seeing out the 2003–04 season with Kidderminster Harriers. He signed with Mansfield Town in June 2004, moving on to Carlisle United in March 2005. He helped Carlisle to win promotion back into the Football League through the Conference National play-offs in 2005 and then to win the League Two title in 2005–06, whilst also reaching the 2006 Football League Trophy final. He joined Torquay United for a £10,000 fee in August 2006 and was sold on to Macclesfield Town for £17,500 in January 2007. He returned to the Conference Premier upon joining Oxford United in January 2008.

He spent two-and-a-half seasons at Oxford, and was club captain for many of his 97 appearances, though missed the second half of the 2009–10 campaign and the subsequent 2010 play-off final victory due to injury. He remained in the Conference Premier, signing with Luton Town in July 2010. Three months later he was loaned out to Mansfield Town in a deal which was made permanent in January 2011. He would spend four-and-a-half seasons with Mansfield, taking his final tally with the club over his four different spells to 211 games and 24 goals. He featured on the losing side in the 2011 FA Trophy Final and was named as the club's Player of the Season as Mansfield won promotion into the Football League as champions of the Conference Premier in 2012–13. He had short loan spells at Rainworth Miners Welfare and Worksop Town after falling out of favour in 2013. He retired from playing at the end of the 2014–15 season, though briefly came out of retirement to play for Sutton Coldfield in 2018.

He was appointed as Mansfield Town's assistant manager whilst still a player and became caretaker manager in November 2014. He got the job permanently the following month, aged just 33, and went on to keep the club in League Two with a 21st place finish. A 12th place finish followed in the 2015–16 season, before he quit the club in November 2016. He was appointed Boston United manager the next month, taking the club to a 15th place finish in the National League North at the end of the 2016–17 season. He resigned in October 2017 and was named as assistant manager at Guiseley the following month. He left Guiseley in February 2018 and went on to coach at Burton Albion, Barnsley, West Bromwich Albion, Port Vale and Beşiktaş. He served Barnsley as caretaker manager in October 2019 and October 2020. He took charge at AFC Fylde in November 2022.

Playing career

Derby County
Born in Birmingham, West Midlands, Murray began his career as a trainee with Derby County at the age of 11. He turned professional in August 1998. He made his Premier League debut on 17 April 1999, coming on as a second-half substitute for Mikkel Beck in Derby's 5–1 defeat away to West Ham United. He made a further three substitute appearances in what remained of the 1998–99 season. Manager Jim Smith would hand him his first start on 6 May 2000, in a 0–0 draw with Newcastle United at Pride Park. This was his only start from eight appearances in the 1999–2000 campaign. He featured 18 times throughout the 2000–01 season. Derby were relegated from the Premier League at the end of the 2001–02 season and Murray featured irregularly under both Smith and Colin Todd.

On 25 February 2002, Murray joined Third Division club Mansfield Town on loan. He scored his first goal in professional football in his second appearance for the "Stags", a 2–1 win over Scunthorpe United at Field Mill on 2 March. He went on to score seven goals in 13 games for Mansfield, leading manager Stuart Watkiss to say that "his goals have been invaluable to us" as Mansfield secured promotion with a third-place finish. Back with Derby in the First Division for the 2002–03 season, Murray gradually established himself in John Gregory's first-team. He received the first sending off of his career on 12 October, getting shown the red card for a reckless challenge late into a 0–0 draw at Bradford City. He featured a total of 24 times that season, bringing his final tally at Derby to 62 appearances.

Transition period
His career stalled whilst he struggled with alcohol addiction problems whilst only 21-years old. Murray was able to gain treatment at the Priory Hospital in 2003 and made a swift return to football after four weeks of treatment. He started the 2003–04 season on loan at Kidderminster Harriers in the Third Division. However he was released from Derby County in November 2003 after having already been transfer-listed in the summer by new Derby manager George Burley. Murray joined Notts County in 2003 after leaving Derby County, during this transition period he played twice in a one-week non-contract spell with Conference club Burton Albion, before returning to Notts County. In January 2004, Murray rejoined Kidderminster Harriers and was a regular in their side until the end of the season. He was released by Kidderminster because of what director of football Jan Mølby said were "financial reasons".

Mansfield Town
In June 2004, he joined Mansfield Town following "lengthy talks with Stags boss Keith Curle". However Curle departed in November and Murray later admitted that he "didn’t really get on with [Curle's successor] Carlton Palmer at all". He scored five goals in 37 games.

Carlisle United
Murray moved on to Brunton Park in March 2005 after Carlisle United manager Paul Simpson succeeded in his fourth attempt to sign him. He played ten games in what remained of the 2004–05 season, helping United to qualify for the Conference National play-offs in third-place. He was an unused substitute in the play-off final as Carlisle returned to the Football League with a 1–0 victory over Stevenage Borough at the Britannia Stadium. Murray scored three goals in 42 appearances during the 2005–06 season, including the equalising goal in the 2006 Football League Trophy Final against Swansea City at the Millennium Stadium. However his side went on to lose 2–1. Carlisle won promotion as champions of League Two. On 10 August 2006, Murray handed in a transfer request to new manager Neil McDonald, after he failed to appear in Carlisle's opening two League One games of the 2006–07 season.

Torquay United
On 31 August 2006, summer transfer deadline day, Murray joined Torquay United for a fee of £10,000; manager Ian Atkins said that "I must admit I'm surprised that the chairman (Mike Bateson) has stuck his neck out financially... but Adam will make a big difference to us". He was a key player for Atkins and his successor Luboš Kubík, and played 25 games in the first half of the 2006–07 season, but opted to leave Plainmoor after what new club chairman Chris Roberts described as "quite severe family problems to deal with nearer his home in the Midlands".

Macclesfield Town
On 10 January 2007, Murray joined fellow League Two side Macclesfield Town, after being signed by manager Paul Ince for a fee of £17,500 on a two-and-a-half-year contract. He made eight starts and three substitute appearances in the second half of the 2006–07 season. He played 25 matches under the stewardship of Ian Brightwell in the first half of the 2007–08 season.

Oxford United
Murray joined Oxford United on 4 January 2008. He signed a new two-year contract in May after being a consistent first-team player at the Kassam Stadium as Oxford ended the 2007–08 season with nine wins in eleven games. He was named as captain in July after manager Darren Patterson said that "he looks incredibly lean and has obviously looked after himself well during the close season". He scored seven goals in 51 appearances across the 2008–09 campaign, and was an ever-present in the league as the "U's" posted a seventh-place finish as they missed out on the play-offs after being deducted five points.

Following an operation on his back, Murray missed the second half of Oxford's 2009–10 campaign, in which they were promoted into the Football League via the play-offs. He was released from the club at the end of the season, after his family failed to settle into the Oxford area, and subsequently returned to Derby. Chairman Kelvin Thomas told the club's official website: "Unfortunately Adam wasn't involved in the final promotion push due to injury, but we do feel that our decision to have players live close has been justified. Adam has made a decision to put his family first, which as a family orientated club we fully understand and appreciate." Speaking in November 2015, Murray said that he had resented manager Chris Wilder for releasing him, but now saw him as one of the best managers in English football and that "when I look back now I respect that decision because I would have done the same thing".

Luton Town
On 7 July 2010, Murray joined Conference Premier side Luton Town on a two-year contract. He made only seven appearances for Richard Money's side and departed Kenilworth Road early in the 2010–11 season.

Return to Mansfield
Murray rejoined Mansfield Town, only  from his home in Derby, on a three-month loan deal on 1 October 2010, with a view to a permanent move taking place in January. On 5 January 2011, Murray made his transfer permanent despite manager David Holdsworth having been replaced by Duncan Russell. He ended the 2010–11 campaign with seven goals in 41 games for Mansfield, who went on to reach the final of the FA Trophy at Wembley Stadium. Murray was substituted 18 minutes into extra-time of the final, with the only goal of the game being scored by Darlington with just one minute left to play. He was appointed club captain in August 2011 and signed a new contract three months later. Mansfield won 13 of their last 15 matches of the 2011–12 season to qualify for the play-offs. They went on to lose to York City in the play-off semi-finals despite Murray and Gary Roberts dominating much of the midfield play.

In June 2012, Murray became assistant manager at Mansfield following Micky Moore's decision to leave. He signed a new one-year deal in November 2012, combining first-team duties with coaching the youth-team. This came a month after he criticised sections of the supporters for dishing out "personal" abuse following a four match run without a win. At the end of the 2012–13 title winning season, The Non-League Paper described how "Muzza the magician grabbed games by the scruff of the neck whether playing in an advanced or deeper role". Promotion was confirmed with a 1–0 victory over Wrexham on 20 April, after which Murray stated that "this is the best without doubt. It’s the best thing I’ve ever done".

Murray fell out with manager Paul Cox early in the 2013–14 season and was loaned out to Rainworth Miners Welfare of the Northern Premier League Division One South. He had an eventful spell at Rainworth, with manager Kevin Gee resigning after Murray was red-carded in a 3–1 home defeat to Brigg Town on 10 September. On 8 November, he joined Northern Premier League Premier Division side Worksop Town on a two-month loan. His loan spell was cut short and he returned to Mansfield on 3 December after making peace with Cox. Upon becoming player-manager at Mansfield, he announced that he would step back from playing to concentrate on management.

On 21 March 2018, he came out of retirement and signed a short-term contract with Sutton Coldfield Town. Town finished the 2017–18 season bottom of the Northern Premier League Premier Division.

Style of play
Described in the Worcester News as a creative midfielder with energy and tenacity in September 2003, Murray earned an England U20 cap the previous year. His vision and range of passing was acknowledged to be largely unparalleled in non-League football.

Coaching career

Mansfield Town
Murray became caretaker manager of Mansfield Town after Paul Cox left the club 19th in the League Two table on 21 November 2014. He rejected advice to take an older mentor as his assistant and instead retained existing coaches Richard Cooper and Micky Moore, who he said were "as hungry as I am for coaching". Murray's first game as manager, a day later at Field Mill, was a 1–0 victory over Plymouth Argyle. After a spell as caretaker manager, Murray was given the job on a permanent basis on 5 December, becoming the youngest manager in the top four divisions of English football. He made four free transfer signings in the January transfer window: defenders Junior Brown, Michael Raynes and Matty Blair, and midfielder Ricky Ravenhill. He sold Rob Taylor to Tranmere Rovers after the versatile player sought a move closer to his home. He also made use of the loan market, bringing in Billy Kee, Callum Elder, Lenny Pidgeley, Jeffrey Monakana, Adam Smith and Terry Hawkridge. Murray signed a new two-year contract in May. Mansfield ended the 2014–15 season in 21st place, seven points above relegated Cheltenham Town, and Murray released seven players in the summer, saying that "I feel the whole club needs a fresh start". Ollie Palmer was also sold to Leyton Orient.

The club underwent a rebuild of the squad for the 2015–16 season, with 15 new players arriving at the club. These free transfer signings included: goalkeepers Brian Jensen and Scott Shearer; defenders Mal Benning, Lee Collins, Nicky Hunt and Krystian Pearce; midfielders Adam Chapman and Mitch Rose; and forwards Chris Beardsley, Matt Green, Nathan Thomas, Craig Westcarr and Adi Yussuf. A positive start saw the team win six and draw four of their opening 12 games to sit fourth in the table in October. However their promotion challenge fell away and Mansfield ended the season mid-table in 12th place. Murray released three players in the summer.

Murray strengthened the team for the 2016–17 season, paying an undisclosed fee for Bury striker Danny Rose. He also made free transfer signings of defenders Rhys Bennett and George Taft; midfielder Kevan Hurst; and forwards CJ Hamilton, Ashley Hemmings, Patrick Hoban and Darius Henderson. Kyle Howkins and Alex Iacovitti also came in on loan. He was nominated for the EFL League Two Manager of the Month award after his team picked up ten points from their opening five fixtures in August. Mansfield fell away after this good start however and Murray was booed by supporters, though denied reports that he was considering quitting the club on 3 November, stating "I'm not going anywhere for a long while." Murray resigned 11 days later, after a 4–0 defeat at Portsmouth left Mansfield 18th in the table.

Boston United
On 9 December 2016, Murray was appointed as manager of Boston United, who were 15th in the National League North table. Murray said that "the possibility of it being more of a project than a job, that’s what pulled me to it". Boston went on to finish the 2016–17 season in 15th place and Murray released four players in the summer. In April 2017 he told the media that he was planning to move the club's training base. He said that there was an "unbelievable" number of players eager to join the club, with summer signings including goalkeeper George Willis; defenders Bradley Beatson, James Clifton, Jack Cowgill, Taron Hare and Jordan Keane; midfielder Jamie McGuire; and forwards Ashley Hemmings, Pearson Mwanyongo, Kabongo Tshimanga and Tyrell Waite. He compared his team to a baby deer after a difficult start to the new season, stating that "they’re a little bit wobbly when they’re born", whilst also saying that "[recruitment has] not been good enough and we take ultimate responsibility for that". On 28 October 2017, Murray left his position as manager of Boston United after a run of one win in 11 games left the club in the bottom two. Upon departing York Street, he said that "they need a shot of confidence and a centre forward, everything else is in place"; the "Pilgrims" went on to finish the 2017–18 season in ninth place. He later admitted it had been a mistake to take the Boston job.

Coaching spells
On 10 November 2017, Murray was appointed as assistant manager to Paul Cox at National League side Guiseley. He left the club when Cox was dismissed on 14 February 2018. He went on to work as Lead Youth Development Phase coach at Burton Albion. Later in 2018 he was appointed as the Barnsley U18 manager and stepped up to assist the first-team the following year. He became caretaker manager after Daniel Stendel was sacked on 8 October 2019. He took charge of five games – three draws and two defeats – until Gerhard Struber was appointed manager on 20 November. On 6 October 2020, Struber left Oakwell and Murray stepped in again to serve as caretaker manager. Valérien Ismaël was named as the club's new manager 17 days later. Murray followed Ismaël to West Bromwich Albion in July 2021, and left The Hawthorns following Ismaël's sacking seven months later. He joined the backroom staff at Port Vale in February 2022 in order to support acting manager Andy Crosby during manager Darrell Clarke's extended period of bereavement leave. He moved to Turkey the following month to assist Ismaël at Süper Lig champions Beşiktaş. He left the club after three months when Ismaël was sacked.

AFC Fylde
On 14 November 2022, Murray was appointed manager of National League North club AFC Fylde on a contract until June 2025. He oversaw an upturn in form that led to him being awarded the league's Manager of the Month award for January 2023 having won four out of his six games in an unbeaten month.

Management style
Murray describes himself as a manager with an eye for detail with the aim of getting the most from the resources available to him by working on 'marginal gains' to get the extra one percent advantage to improve his players and teams performances. At Mansfield Murray developed a passing game adopted from the Dutch total football model but tailored to lower league players. Murray is known to be an advocate of sports science, sports analysis, strength and conditioning, and sports psychology within football in order to achieve maximum gains on the field. Murray has often spoken about the importance of building the right infrastructure for his teams including the importance of a strong academy system for young players to develop into the first-team environment. His success with developing young talent includes such players as Ryan Tafazolli, who cites Murray as the biggest influence on his career as a young player and credits him with "developing him from a boy to a man".

Personal life
Murray's wife, Lyndsey, gave birth to his fourth child in October 2015. Former Derby County youth-team teammate Karl Hawley was the best man at his wedding.

Career statistics

Playing statistics

Managerial statistics

Honours

As a player
Mansfield Town
Football League Third Division third-place promotion: 2001–02
FA Trophy runner-up: 2010–11
Conference Premier: 2012–13

Carlisle United
Conference National play-offs: 2005
Football League Two: 2005–06
Football League Trophy runner-up: 2005–06

Individual
Mansfield Town Player of the Season: 2012–13

As a manager
Individual
National League North Manager of the Month: January 2023

References

1981 births
Living people
Footballers from Birmingham, West Midlands
English footballers
England youth international footballers
Association football midfielders
Derby County F.C. players
Mansfield Town F.C. players
Kidderminster Harriers F.C. players
Notts County F.C. players
Burton Albion F.C. players
Carlisle United F.C. players
Torquay United F.C. players
Macclesfield Town F.C. players
Oxford United F.C. players
Luton Town F.C. players
Rainworth Miners Welfare F.C. players
Worksop Town F.C. players
Sutton Coldfield Town F.C. players
Premier League players
English Football League players
National League (English football) players
Northern Premier League players
English football managers
Mansfield Town F.C. managers
Boston United F.C. managers
AFC Fylde managers
English Football League managers
National League (English football) managers
Mansfield Town F.C. non-playing staff
Burton Albion F.C. non-playing staff
Barnsley F.C. non-playing staff
West Bromwich Albion F.C. non-playing staff
Port Vale F.C. non-playing staff
Beşiktaş J.K. non-playing staff